Megasoma thersites is a species of scarab beetle. It is endemic to Baja California, Mexico. Adults are attracted by light and feed on the cambium of palo verde (Parkinsonia florida subsp. peninsulare).

References 

Dynastinae
Beetles described in 1861
Beetles of North America
Endemic insects of Mexico
Endemic fauna of the Baja California Peninsula